Tharybidae is a family of copepods belonging to the order Calanoida.

Genera:
 Neoscolecithrix Canu, 1896
 Parundinella Fleminger, 1957
 Rythabis Schulz & Beckmann, 1995
 Tharybis Sars, 1902
 Undinella Sars, 1900

References

Copepods